William Shadrack Cole is an American jazz musician, ethnomusicologist, professor of music, professor of African-American studies, and author. As All About Jazz jazz journalist Dan McClenaghan put it, "Cole – a rare breed of jazz artist who has focused his efforts on uniting Eastern sounds with the American art form – is a musical seeker who has, over the better part of four decades [since 1974], mastered an array of non-traditional, non-Western [wind] instruments." Cole specializes in the Ghanaian atenteben, the Chinese suona, the Korean hojok and piri, the South Indian nagaswaram, the North Indian shehnai, the Tibetan trumpet, and the Australian didjeridu. Cole has a Ph.D. in ethnomusicology from Wesleyan University. Cole has written two books, one on Miles Davis and one on John Coltrane. Cole is the founder and leader of the Untempered Ensemble.

Academic career 
Cole was professor of music at Amherst College from 1972 to 1974 and at Dartmouth College from 1974 to 1990. Dartmouth awarded Cole tenure in 1979, full professorship in 1985, and an honorary degree in 1987. Cole, for three years, beginning 1981, was Chair of the Music Department. From 2005 to 2010, Cole was Professor of African American Studies at Syracuse University, where he served as Chair of the Department. Cole retired in 2010 as Professor Emeritus. Syracuse, in 2010, appointed Renate Simson, PhD (1934–2017), to succeed Cole. She was a scholar and teacher of 19th century African-American literature, as Chair of the Department.

Jazz multi-instrumentalist and ethnomusicologist Nathan Davis, PhD, was Cole's academic advisor when he was working on his master's degree at the University of Pittsburgh. Davis was Cole's first African-American teacher in all his formal education, stretching back to kindergarten. Clifford Thornton, PhD, was Cole's academic advisor when he was working on his doctorate at Wesleyan University. Cole also studied with Sam Rivers, visiting artist at Wesleyan.

Musical collaborations 
Cole has performed with Ornette Coleman, Jayne Cortez, Julius Hemphill, Sam Rivers, James Blood Ulmer, and Fred Ho.

Books 

 Miles Davis: The Early Years (1974)
  John Coltrane (1976).In his book about Coltrane, Cole states, "Wherein, then, lies the magic of this man's music? The answer, from my point of view, is that it dealt with human problems in human terms for human beings in a human world. If there is 'turmoil' in his music, it includes the turmoil in the hearts and minds of ordinary men and women. It includes the turmoil and violence of the times through which Trane lived. But the magic in Trane's music also must derive from the 'peace which passeth all understanding' that was in this man's heart." Later in the book, Cole reflects on the bombing of the 16th Street Baptist Church Birmingham that killed four African-American girls. He points out that the melodic line of "Alabama," composed and first recorded as a memorial to the tragedy by Coltrane November 18, 1963 –  days after the event – "was developed from the rhythmic inflections of a speech given by Dr. Martin Luther King."Jazz critic John Wilson, in his review of Cole's book on Coltrane, stated, "Cole has done a painstaking job of analyzing the recordings, looking at them almost phrase by phrase (with the help of Andrew White's transcriptions)."

Discography

Solo and with selected artists

 

 
 
 

 

 

 

 
       
        

 

 
       
    
    
    
    
    

 Boy From Black Mountain (2009)

Bill Cole's Untempered Ensemble

 
 The Untempered Trio (1992).

       
    
    
    
    
    
    

 

 First CD:
       
    
 Second CD:
       
             
       
       
       
       
       
       
       
       
       
       
       

 

 

 
       
    "Grounded"
    
    
    
    
    
    
    

 
       
    
    
    

 
       
    
    
Boxholder (de)

 

 

       
    
    
    
    

 
       Part I
    Part II
The performance was dedicated to Wilber Morris, bassist who died August 8, 2002.

Videography

Attacks by the Dartmouth Review
Prologue
The Dartmouth Review – an arch-conservative publication founded in 1980, not affiliated with the college but operated by students – had been part of an aggressive movement to criticize Dartmouth's academic programs in non-Eurocentric disciplines, including Women's Studies, African-American Studies and ethnomusicology. The Review had published provocative criticism of its interpretation of political correctness on subjects ranging from Apartheid in South Africa to sexual orientation to race. William F. Buckley Jr., and his publication, the National Review, supported the Review with (i) funding and (ii), from 1982 to 1998, more than two dozen editorials by authors that included Laura Ingraham (then a student), Jeffrey Hart (Dartmouth faculty member whose son, Benjamin, had been an editor for the ), and David Boaz.

Part One
Beginning in 1983, the Review ran a series of antagonistic articles that harshly ridiculed Cole, personally and professionally. Laura Ingraham, then a student, authored the first one in January 1983. Dinesh D'Souza, then a student, was the paper's chairman; Edmond William Cattan Jr., was editor-in-chief. After two local newspapers cited the Review and declared Cole "incompetent", Cole sued the Review for slander. Also, Cole, in April 1983, filed a libel suit in Burlington's U.S. District Court for $600,000 against the publisher (Hanover Review, Inc.), D'Souza, Cattan, and Ingraham – but later dropped that suit. The slander case was settled out of court after two years without the Review admitting guilt or providing any monetary compensation, but both the Reviews and Cole's reputations were damaged.

Part Two
In 1988, four students who were Review journalists – John William Quilhot (with a camera), John Henby Sutter (with a tape recorder), Christopher Baldwin (with a printout of the Review's editorial policy statement), and Sean Nolan – all white, showed up to Cole's classroom, after class, to give Cole a copy of the editorial policy and demand an apology for his remarks during the second of two phone calls made in an attempt to give him an opportunity to reply to the article, "Dartmouth's Dynamic Duo of Mediocrity", of February 24, 1988. The confrontation grew into an altercation, for about five minutes, during which Quilhot was taking photos. Cole grabbed Quilhot's arm, which, among other things, resulted in damaging the camera flash. Dartmouth College charged all four with harassment and disorderly conduct, and suspended the first three – Quilhot until fall 1988 (two quarters), Sutter until fall 1989 (four quarters), and Baldwin until fall 1989 (four quarters). Nolan was placed on disciplinary probation for four quarters. A lawsuit, in Federal Court, against the college, filed in 1989 by the Review, ensued.  On January 3, 1989, the Grafton County Superior Court, in state court parallel litigation, revoked the suspensions of Sutter and Baldwin. The Federal Court later dismissed the suit against Dartmouth College.

When 60 Minutes aired a segment about the lawsuit November 13, 1988, Morley Safer, the host, left out the Review's political connections. Quilhot was subsequently invited by then Senator Dan Quayle to spend his summer suspension as an unpaid volunteer in his Washington office. Esi Eggleston Bracey ('91), then a student who witnessed the confrontation told PBS Frontline, "That moment let me know that there are people in the world who hate you just because of your color  not dislike you, or choose not to be friends with you, but hate you".

Epilogue
In August 1990 – after sixteen years at Dartmouth with tenure, under duress of seven years of repeated attacks by the Review – Cole resigned. "I was totally blackballed." A year later, as a guest lecturer in Bill Dixon's class at Bennington College, Cole reflected on the cost of success in a White world: "I was taught all my life that if you get an education, things will open up. But what I learned is if you want to help your own people, it won't open up." "You have to sell yourself out enough so when you look in the mirror in the morning, you don't know who that is".

Family 
Cole was born to William Lucius "John" Cole (1896–1961) and Gladys Alice Seel (1902–1997). Cole, a Miles Davis scholar, shared a distinction with Miles. Both of their fathers were dentists.  Cole's first wife, Linda Joy Punchatz (maiden), an artist, is a niece of the late science fiction and fantasy artist Don Ivan Punchatz (1936–2009), whose son, Gregor Punchatz (her cousin), is a digital artist for film and video games.

Bibliography

Annotations

Notes

References

 Alternate URL
 
 
 
 
 
 

 
 
 

 

 


Album reviews

Discography references

External links
 
 Shadrack, Inc.

1937 births
Living people
American jazz musicians
Free jazz musicians
Avant-garde jazz musicians
Musicians from Pittsburgh
University of Pittsburgh alumni
Wesleyan University alumni
Dartmouth College faculty
Syracuse University faculty
Jazz writers
American music historians
American male non-fiction writers
Black studies scholars
Jazz musicians from New York (state)
Jazz musicians from Pennsylvania